Dhawalgaon  is a panchayat village in the state of Maharashtra, India. Administratively, Dhawalgaon is under Shrigonda Taluka of Ahmadnagar District in Maharashtra. There is only the single village of Dhawalgaon in the Dhawalgaon gram panchayat.

Demographics  
In the 2011 census, the village of Dhawalgaon had 2,343 inhabitants, with 1,229 males (52%) and 1,114 females (48%), for a gender ratio of 906 females per thousand males.

References

External links 
 

Villages in Ahmednagar district